Rátót is a village in Vas county, Hungary.

Kálmán Széll, the Prime Minister of Hungary between 1899 and 1903 died here in 1915.

References

Populated places in Vas County

Twin cities
  Királyhelmec – Slovakia
  Sokobanja – Serbia
  Düsseldorf – Germany
  Alytus – Lithuania